The following people played for the Philadelphia Quakers for at least one game in the 1926 AFL regular season, the only one of the team’s (and the league’s) existence:

1 Played fullback, blocking back (position later called “quarterback”), and wingback
2 Also played end
3 Also played center
4 Played blocking back, tailback, wingback, and fullback
5 Played five games for Cleveland Panthers before the team folded
6 Played tailback and fullback
7 Also played guard and end
8 Started 1926 season on New York Giants roster
9 Played wingback, tailback, and blocking back

References

 
Philadelphia Quakers (AFL) players